Ticket to Paradise is a 1936 American drama film directed by Aubrey Scotto, written by Jack Natteford and Nathanael West, and starring Roger Pryor, Wendy Barrie, Claude Gillingwater, Andrew Tombes, Luis Alberni and E. E. Clive. It was released on June 25, 1936, by Republic Pictures.

Premise
While hurrying to the airport to catch a plane, a man is involved in a car accident and loses his memory.

Cast
Roger Pryor as Terry Dodd aka Jack Doe
Wendy Barrie as Jane Forbes
Claude Gillingwater as Robert Forbes
Andrew Tombes as Nirney
Luis Alberni as Dr. Munson aka Monte
E. E. Clive as Barkins 
Stanley Fields as Dan Kelly
Theodore von Eltz as George Small
Russell Hicks as Colton
Herbert Rawlinson as Fred Townsend
John Sheehan as Taxi Driver
Earle Hodgins as Cab Starter
Grace Hayle as Minnie Dawson
Harry Woods as John Dawson
Gavin Gordon as Tony Bates
Harry Harvey Sr. as Spotter
Duke York as Milkman
Eric Mayne as Dr. Eckstrom
Bud Jamison as Taxi Dispatcher
Wallace Gregory as Intern
Fern Emmett as Nurse
Eleanor Huntley as Nurse
Harrison Greene as Merry-Go-Round Man
Shirley O'Brien as Gracie

References

External links
 
 
 
 * 

1936 films
1936 drama films
American black-and-white films
American drama films
Films about amnesia
Films directed by Aubrey Scotto
Republic Pictures films
Films produced by Nat Levine
1930s English-language films
1930s American films